Giulia Lorenzoni (born 11 March 1940) is an Italian fencer. She competed at the 1968, 1972 and 1976 Summer Olympics.

References

1940 births
Living people
Italian female fencers
Olympic fencers of Italy
Fencers at the 1968 Summer Olympics
Fencers at the 1972 Summer Olympics
Fencers at the 1976 Summer Olympics
Sportspeople from Brescia